Sekine Evren (née Kankotan; 1922 – 3 March 1982) was the First Lady of Turkey from 12 September 1980 until her death on 3 March 1982 during the presidency of her husband Kenan Evren.

Sekine Kankotan was born as the first daughter of a vine grower in Alaşehir of Manisa, then Ottoman Empire, in 1922. She had three younger sisters. She could not complete her education. She married Senior lieutenant Kenan Evren in 1944 without the permission of her parents. She lost her first child at birth as her husband was assigned to the Turkish Brigade during the Korean War (1950–1953). She gave birth to three daughters Şenay, Gülay and Miray. Evren became diabetic at an early age. During a trip in Brussels, Belgium in May 1980, she contracted a heart attack and became paralyzed.

On 12 September 1980, the Turkish Armed Forces under the leadership of Chief of the General Staff four-star general Kenan Evren staged a military coup. The military junta overturned the government, and appointed Kenan Evren head of state. Sekine Evren rejected to move in the presidential residence Çankaya Mansion because her husband was self-proclaimed President and was not legitimately selected. She remained residing in the military lodging.

Sekine Evren died on 3 March 1982. She was interred following a state funeral held at the Hacı Bayram Mosque in Ankara.

References

1922 births
People from Alaşehir
First Ladies of Turkey
1982 deaths
Burials at Cebeci Asri Cemetery